Yogi Bear is an anthropomorphic animal character who has appeared in numerous comic books, animated television shows and films. He made his debut in 1958 as a supporting character in The Huckleberry Hound Show.

Yogi Bear was the first breakout character in animated television; he was created by Hanna-Barbera and was eventually more popular than ostensible star Huckleberry Hound. In January 1961, he was given his own show, The Yogi Bear Show, sponsored by Kellogg's, which included the segments Snagglepuss and Yakky Doodle. Hokey Wolf replaced his segment on The Huckleberry Hound Show. A musical animated feature film, Hey There, It's Yogi Bear!, was released in 1964.

Yogi was one of the several Hanna-Barbera characters to have a collar. This allowed animators to keep his body relatively static, redrawing only his head in each frame when he spokeone of the ways Hanna-Barbera cut costs, reducing the number of drawings needed for a seven-minute cartoon from around 14,000 to around 2,000.

Personality

Like many Hanna-Barbera characters, Yogi's personality and mannerisms were based on a popular celebrity of the time. Art Carney's Ed Norton character on The Honeymooners was said to be Yogi's inspiration; his voice mannerisms broadly mimic Carney as Norton. Carney, in turn, received influence from the Borscht Belt and comedians of vaudeville.

Yogi's name was similar to that of contemporary baseball star Yogi Berra, who was known for his amusing quotes, such as "half the lies they tell about me aren't true." Berra sued Hanna-Barbera for defamation, but their management claimed the similarity was just coincidence. Berra withdrew his suit, but the defense was considered implausible. At the time Yogi Bear first hit TV screens, Yogi Berra was a household name. Journalist Walter Brasch once wrote that "whether coincidence or not, it is difficult to find anyone else in the [animation] industry who believes it."

The plot of most of Yogi's cartoons centered on his antics in the fictional Jellystone Park, a variant of the real Yellowstone National Park. Yogi, accompanied by his constant companion Boo-Boo Bear, would often try to steal picnic baskets from campers in the park, much to the displeasure of Park Ranger Smith. Yogi's girlfriend, Cindy Bear, sometimes appeared and usually disapproved of Yogi's antics.

Catchphrases
Besides often speaking in rhyme, Yogi Bear had a number of catchphrases, including his famous chant of excitement and greeting ("Hey, Hey, Hey"), his pet name for picnic baskets ("pic-a-nic baskets"), and his favorite self-promotion ("I'm smarter than the av-er-age bear!"), although he often overestimates his own cleverness. Another characteristic of Yogi was his deep and silly voice. He often greets the ranger with a cordial, "Hello, Mr. Ranger, sir!" and "Hey there, Boo Boo!" as his preferred greeting to his sidekick, Boo Boo. Yogi would also often use puns in his speech and had a habit of pronouncing large words with a long vocal flourish.

Voice actors

From the time of the character's debut until 1988, Yogi was voiced by voice actor Daws Butler. Butler died in 1988; his last performance as Yogi was in the television film Yogi and the Invasion of the Space Bears.

In 1983, a Yogi Bear balloon made its first appearance in the Macy's Thanksgiving Day Parade, becoming the final balloon that year. That same year, he appeared on a float named A Hanna-Barbera Christmas alongside many other Hanna-Barbera characters, as they cleaned up the streets of Broadway. The performance was bookended with animated segments featuring Yogi and Boo-Boo, voiced by Mel Blanc and Butler, respectively.

After Butler's death in 1988, Greg Burson stepped in to perform the role; Butler had taught Burson personally how to voice Yogi as well as his other characters. Worsening alcoholism and a legal incident led to Burson's firing in 2004 and eventually his death in 2008.

Yogi's current voice actor is Jeff Bergman. Bergman and Billy West also performed the character throughout the 1990s and early to mid-2000s for various Cartoon Network and Boomerang commercials and bumpers.

Australian voice actor, animation historian and impressionist Keith Scott provided Yogi's voice in a Pauls commercial and the live show Hanna-Barbera Gala Celebrity Night at the Wonderland Sydney amusement park in Australia, where Yogi and other Hanna-Barbera characters including Huckleberry Hound, Scooby-Doo, George Jetson, Fred Flintstone, Barney Rubble, Wilma Flintstone and Betty Rubble make guest appearances.

In the 2010 Yogi Bear film, the character is voiced by actor Dan Aykroyd.

In a Müller commercial in 2011 titled "Wünderful Stuff", Lewis MacLeod performed the voice of Yogi.

In the animated stop motion sketch comedy show Robot Chicken, Dan Milano and Seth Green (creator of the show) voiced Yogi Bear.

Scott Innes performed the voice of Yogi, along with Boo-Boo, in At Picnic, Forest, and Honey Lesson.

Media

Television series

Other appearances
 The Flintstones (1963), Yogi and Boo-Boo steal Fred and Wilma's "pic-a-nic basket" in "The Swedish Visitors".
 The New Scooby-Doo Movies (1972), guest cameo on the giant balloon in "The Caped Crusader Caper".
 Laff-A-Lympics (1977–1978), this show had Yogi Bear as captain of the Yogi Yahooeys team, with Boo-Boo and Cindy also part of the team.
 Wake, Rattle, and Roll (1990–1991), he and Boo-Boo appear in the Fender Bender 500 segment.
 A Pup Named Scooby-Doo, guest cameo in "The Story Stick".
 Family Guy (1999), a random spoofed version of Yogi and Boo-Boo's appearance in Season 5, Episode 3, but Peter Griffin brutally kills him using a hunter's knife as a favor to the Park Ranger.
 The Grim Adventures of Billy & Mandy (2003–2008), Yogi and Boo-Boo have a guest appearance in Season 2, Episode 7. And also, they made brief cameos in Season 4, Episode 3.
 Scooby-Doo! Mystery Incorporated, a crazed feral bear resembling Yogi Bear appears near the end of "Howl of the Fright Hound".
 Appearing in the form of short cameos in Space Jam: A New Legacy, Yogi and Boo-Boo can be seen with other Warner Bros. owned characters beside them.
 Yogi and Boo-Boo, along with other Hanna-Barbera and Looney Tunes characters make cameo appearances in the "Suffragette City" song on the Animaniacs revival. They were previously parodied in the original show as "Calhoun Capybara and Lew-Lew" as the Warner siblings were loaned out to appear in their cartoon.
 On May 10, 2021, Yogi and Boo-Boo appeared in a commercial advertisement for GEICO raiding a family cookout in "bear country".

Animated films and specials
 Hey There, It's Yogi Bear!, a 1964 animated feature released by Warner Bros. Pictures and Columbia Pictures
 Yogi's Ark Lark, a 1972 made-for-TV movie for The ABC Saturday Superstar Movie
 Hanna-Barbera's All-Star Comedy Ice Revue, a 1978 TV special honoring Fred Flintstone on his 48th birthday
 Casper's First Christmas, a 1979 TV special featuring the characters from Casper and the Angels meeting Yogi and his gang
 Yogi's First Christmas, a 1980 made-for-TV movie for syndication
 Yogi Bear's All Star Comedy Christmas Caper, a 1982 TV special starring Yogi and friends
 Yogi's Great Escape, a 1987 made-for-TV movie for syndication
 Yogi Bear and the Magical Flight of the Spruce Goose, a 1987 made-for-TV movie for syndication
 Yogi and the Invasion of the Space Bears, a 1988 made-for-TV movie for syndication
 The Good, the Bad, and Huckleberry Hound, a 1988 made-for-TV movie for syndication
 Hanna-Barbera's 50th: A Yabba Dabba Doo Celebration, a 1989 musical TV film
 Yogi the Easter Bear, a 1994 TV special for first-run syndication
 Arabian Nights, a 1994 TV special for TBS (Aladdin segment)
 Scooby-Doo! Mask of the Blue Falcon, 2013 direct-to-DVD (cameo as picture)
 Space Jam: A New Legacy, a 2021 animated feature released by Warner Bros. Pictures (cameo)

Educational films
 Hanna-Barbera Educational Filmstrips
 Yogi Bear: Play it Safe (1979)
 Yogi Bear Visits His Medical Friends (1980)
 Learning Tree Filmstrip Set
 Learning About Citizenship with Yogi Bear (1982)
 Learning About Groups and Rules with Yogi Bear (1982)
 Earthquake Preparedness (1984)
 D.A.R.E. Bear Yogi (1989)

Video games
 Yogi's Frustration (Intellivision) (1983)
 Yogi Bear (computer) (1987)
 Yogi Bear & Friends in The Greed Monster (Commodore 64) (1990)
 Yogi Bear's Math Adventures (DOS) (1990)
 Yogi's Great Escape (computer) (1990)
 Yo Yogi Bear (Tiger handheld) (1991)
 Yogi's Big Clean Up (Amiga) (1992)
 Adventures of Yogi Bear (Super NES) (1994)
 Yogi Bear's Gold Rush (Game Boy) (1994)
 Yogi Bear: Great Balloon Blast (Game Boy Color) (2000)
 Yogi Bear: The Video Game (Wii, Nintendo DS) (2010)

Albums
 Hey There, It's Yogi Bear!, a 1964 music from the original motion picture soundtrack
 Yogi Bear and the Three Stooges Meet the Mad, Mad, Mad Dr. No-No, a 1966 comedy album
 Yogi Bear, a 2010 score soundtrack by John Debney

Live action/animated feature film
A live-action/computer-animated film titled Yogi Bear was released by Warner Bros. in December 2010. The movie featured Dan Aykroyd as the voice of Yogi Bear. The film, adapting the television series, follows the adventures of Yogi Bear and his pal Boo-Boo in Jellystone Park, as they team up with Ranger Smith to save Jellystone Park from being shut down and logged.

Songs
"Yogi" by The Ivy Three (1960), sung in a voice mimicking Yogi Bear. The song reached no.8 on the Billboard Hot100.

Entertainer Ray Wilde sung a song that became viral for its rude lyrics about Yogi Bear

Spümcø Ranger Smith and Boo Boo shorts
In 1999, animator John Kricfalusi's Spümcø company created and directed two Yogi cartoons, A Day in the Life of Ranger Smith and Boo Boo Runs Wild. Both shorts aired that year on the Cartoon Network as part of a Yogi Bear marathon.

In 2002, Spümcø created another Boo Boo cartoon, Boo Boo and the Man, which was made with Macromedia Flash and released on Cartoon Network's website.

A music video (known as a "Cartoon Groovie") for Yogi Bear used to air on Cartoon Network and Boomerang. It showcases clips of Yogi and Boo Boo stealing picnic baskets and annoying Ranger Smith.

Broadcasts
Yogi Bear aired on Cartoon Network from 1992 to 2004 and its sister channel, Boomerang until 2014. Additionally, Nickelodeon re-aired The Yogi Bear Show, Yogi's Gang, and Galaxy Goof-Ups under the umbrella title "Nickelodeon's Most Wanted: Yogi Bear" throughout the early 1990s.
In the UK it aired on Cartoon Network from 1993 to 2001, CN TOO from 2006 to 2010 and Boomerang from 2000 to 2002.

In the Hanna-Barbera Personal Favorites video, William Hanna and Joseph Barbera picked their favorite Yogi Bear episodes, including the very first one, "Yogi Bear's Big Break", and Yogi's meeting some storybook friends: The Three Little Pigs, Snow White and the Seven Dwarfs and Little Red Riding Hood.

Comics
Over the years, several publishers have released Yogi Bear comic books.

 Dell Comics first published Yogi Bear comics starting in 1959 as part of their Four Color Comics line. The Four Color issue numbers were #1067 Yogi Bear (December 1, 1959), #1104 Yogi Bear Goes to College (June 1, 1960), #1162 Yogi Bear Joins the Marines (April 1, 1961), #1271 Yogi Bear's Birthday Party (November 1, 1961), #1310 Huck and Yogi Winter Sports (1962) (also featuring Huckleberry Hound) and #1349 Yogi Bear Visits the U.N. (January 1, 1962). In March 1961, Dell also published a 116-page one-shot entitled Huck and Yogi Jamboree (also featuring Huckleberry Hound). Starting in September 1961, Dell began publishing a regular comic under the title Yogi Bear which ran for six issues. The last Dell issue being July–September 1962.
 Gold Key Comics took over publishing the Yogi Bear title in October 1962, continuing the issue numbering from the last Dell issue. Gold Key published 33 issues from 1962 to 1970.
 Charlton Comics next did a title for 35 issues from 1970 to 1977.
 Marvel Comics did a title for nine issues in 1977.
 Harvey Comics then did several titles for a total of ten issues in 1992–94.
 Archie Comics regularly featured Yogi Bear stories in the anthology comics Hanna-Barbera All-Stars and Hanna-Barbera Presents. After the cancellation of both titles, Archie Comics put out one issue of a Yogi Bear comic in 1997.
 DC Comics semi-regularly featured Yogi in Cartoon Network Presents.
 DC Comics Scooby-Doo! Team-Up #35 (Bear-ly Scared)
 DC Comics Deathstroke/Yogi Bear Special #1

The Yogi Bear comic strip began February 5, 1961. Created by Gene Hazelton and distributed by the McNaught Syndicate, it ran from 1961 to 1988.

Hanna-Barbera has also produced giveaway instructional Yogi Bear comics on first aid (Creative First Aid: Yogi's Bear Facts (1986)) and earthquake preparedness (Yogi, the Be-Prepared Bear: Earthquake Preparedness for Children (1984) and Yogi's Bear Facts: Earthquake Preparedness (1988)). These were issued in connection with Yogi Bear being used as the mascot for Earthquake Preparedness Month in California, an annual campaign that ran each April for over ten years and also utilized Yogi in earthquake preparedness posters, advertisements, a cartoon, and other promotions including a special "Quakey Shakey Van" exhibit.

Home media
On November 15, 2005, Warner Home Video released the complete series on DVD.

Licensing
 Yogi Bear lends his name to a chain of recreational vehicle and camping parks ("Yogi Bear's Jellystone Park Camp-Resorts"), with the first opening in 1969 in Sturgeon Bay, Wisconsin. As of 2019, more than eighty locations in the United States and Canada have hosted the parks.
 , one restaurant remains from the chain bearing Yogi's name, "Yogi Bear's Honey Fried Chicken", in Hartsville, South Carolina.

See also

 Boo-Boo Bear
 List of Hanna-Barbera characters
 List of Yogi Bear characters
 List of works produced by Hanna-Barbera
 Theatrically released films based on Hanna-Barbera animations
 Yogi's Gang
 The New Yogi Bear Show
 Yo Yogi!
 Yogi's Treasure Hunt

References

External links
 
 
 

 

Charlton Comics titles
Anthropomorphic bears
Adventure comics
Humor comics
Comics about bears
Comics set in forests
Forests in fiction
Male characters in animation
Male characters in comics
Television characters introduced in 1958
Gold Key Comics titles
Hanna-Barbera characters
Harvey Comics titles
Marvel Comics titles
Television shows adapted into comics
Television shows adapted into films
Television shows adapted into video games
Fictional thieves